Tulenkantajat (″The Flame Bearers″) was a literary group in Finland during the 1920s. Their main task was to find a way to take Finland from so-called backwoods culture to the new, modern European level of literature. They did not consider their manifestos to form a program of any sort, but instead stated that their group was the "new feeling of life", building on humility, courage, and the sense of community. The group published their own magazine Tulenkantajat. The editorial of the first issue emphasized the group's unconnectedness to any political party, if not even apoliticism. However, less than a decade later the group disbanded partly due to political conflicts, as some members ended up being strictly on the left while others openly promoted the values of the Academic Karelia Society.

In the 1930s, Erkki Vala launched another Tulenkantajat magazine which he published from 1932 to 1939. Vala's magazine was more political compared to its predecessor.

Positioning
The group's main motto was Ikkunat auki Eurooppaan ("Windows open to Europe") and its members visited Europe's major cities such as Paris, Rome, London, and Berlin. The young people who started Tulenkantajat in their early 20s ended up being important cultural characters in Finnish society. Tulenkantajat's poetry and prose received inspiration from oriental themes, jazz, city and industry life, as well as hedonism.

Notable members
Some of the best known members of Tulenkantajat were:
 Uuno Kailas
 Arvi Kivimaa
 Martti Haavio (pen name P. Mustapää)
 Yrjö Jylhä
 Olavi Paavolainen
 Ilmari Pimiä 
 Nyrki Tapiovaara
 Elina Vaara
 Erkki Vala
 Katri Vala
 Mika Waltari

References

Finnish literature
Finnish artist groups and collectives
1920s in Finland